The 7th constituency of Hérault is a French legislative constituency in the Hérault département.

Description

In 2013, the population of this electoral district was 135,992.
In the 2017 Legislative elections, the number of voters was 102,087.

Deputies

Election results

2022

 
 

  

 
 
|-
| colspan="8" bgcolor="#E9E9E9"|
|-
 
 

 

 
 
 

* PS dissident

2017

2012

2007

 
 
 
 
 
 
|-
| colspan="8" bgcolor="#E9E9E9"|
|-

2002

 
 
 
 
 
 
|-
| colspan="8" bgcolor="#E9E9E9"|
|-

1997

 
 
 
 
 
 
|-
| colspan="8" bgcolor="#E9E9E9"|
|-
 
 

 
 
 
 
 

* Withdrew before the 2nd round

Sources

 Official results of French elections: 

7